Joe Quinn may refer to:

Joe Quinn (actor) (1917–1971), American actor
Joe Quinn (catcher) (died 1893), Major League Baseball player
Joe Quinn (second baseman) (1864–1940), Major League Baseball player and manager
Joseph Quinn (1861–1887), New York wrestler and murder victim
Joseph Quinn (actor), (b. 15 May 1993) British actor
Joseph Andrew Quinn (1886-1939), American politician and lawyer
Joseph F. Quinn (1857–1929), Massachusetts state court judge
Joey Quinn, a character on the television series Dexter

See also
Joaquín